Hemibagrus semotus is a species of bagrid catfish found in the Padas River drainage and the shorter coastal rivers which drain the west face of the Crocker Range in northern Borneo, Sabah, Malaysia.

References

Bagridae
Fish of Asia
Fish of Malaysia
Taxa named by Heok Hee Ng
Taxa named by Maurice Kottelat
Fish described in 2013